Clewlow is a surname. Notable people with the surname include:

Frank Clewlow (1885–1957), English-born Australian actor and theatre director
Melanie Clewlow (born 1976), English field hockey player
Sid Clewlow (1919–1989), English footballer